Jan Martin Gerardus Notermans (29 July 1932 – 8 June 2017) was a Dutch football player and manager.

He played for Fortuna '54 and Sittardia. He capped 25 times for Netherlands.

He coached Arminia Bielefeld, Go Ahead Eagles, FC Groningen, AZ, Helmond Sport and Willem II.

References

1932 births
2017 deaths
AZ Alkmaar managers
Eredivisie players
People from Sittard
Dutch footballers
Netherlands international footballers
Association football midfielders
Fortuna Sittard players
Dutch football managers
Arminia Bielefeld managers
Go Ahead Eagles managers
FC Groningen managers
Helmond Sport managers
Willem II (football club) managers
Deaths from dementia in the Netherlands
Deaths from Alzheimer's disease
Dutch expatriate football managers
Expatriate football managers in Germany
Dutch expatriate sportspeople in Germany
Footballers from Limburg (Netherlands)